Alois Reinhardt (born 18 November 1961 in Höchstadt) is a German football coach and a former player.

Club career 
The defender played more than 250 matches in the (West) German top-flight.

International career 
Reinhardt won four caps for the West Germany national team in 1989 and 1990.

Honours 

 UEFA Cup: 1987–88
 DFB-Pokal: runner-up 1981–82
 Bundesliga runner-up: 1992–93

Trivia 
His son Dominik Reinhardt is also a professional footballer.

References

External links
 
 
 

1961 births
Living people
People from Höchstadt
Sportspeople from Middle Franconia
German footballers
German football managers
Germany international footballers
Germany under-21 international footballers
Bundesliga players
2. Bundesliga players
1. FC Nürnberg players
Bayer 04 Leverkusen players
FC Bayern Munich footballers
Association football defenders
UEFA Cup winning players
Footballers from Bavaria
Olympic footballers of West Germany
West German footballers